Ethmia bombina is a moth in the family Depressariidae. It was described by Sattler in 1967. It is found in China (Sichuan).

References

Moths described in 1967
bombina